Sanda Wizala (Arakanese:စန္ဒာဝိဇလ; was a king of the Mrauk-U Dynasty of Arakan.

References

Bibliography
 
 
 
 

Wizala, Sanda
Wizala, Sanda
Wizala, Sanda